Serpent Saints: The Ten Amendments is the ninth album by Swedish death metal band Entombed, released in June 2007. It was their last one before their two-year breakup from 2014 to 2016. It is the first album with bassist Nico Elgstrand and drummer Olle Dahlstedt, as well as the band's first without longtime guitarist Uffe Cederlund. The album marks the final time to feature original vocalist LG Petrov before the band's breakup in 2014 and his death in 2021. 

Like Morning Star and Inferno, the album was largely considered a throwback to the band's traditional death metal roots, with the hard rock-influenced sections being eschewed almost entirely.

Track listing

Personnel
Lars-Göran Petrov – vocals
Alex Hellid – guitars
Nico Elgstrand – bass
Olle Dahlstedt – drums

References

Entombed (band) albums
2007 albums